Dennis John is a former rugby union coach and player, most notably with Pontypridd RFC. John was appointed caretaker coach to the Wales national rugby union team for 2 matches in 1998 following the departure of Kevin Bowring.

References

External links
Pontypridd profile
Wales profile

Living people
Pontypridd RFC players
Wales national rugby union team coaches
Welsh rugby union coaches
Welsh rugby union players
Year of birth missing (living people)